Kinasewich is a surname. Notable people with the surname include:

 Ray Kinasewich (1933–2021), Canadian ice hockey player and coach 
 Ryan Kinasewich (born 1983), Canadian ice hockey player